Mothers of the Movement is a group of women whose African American children have been killed by police officers or by gun violence. Members of the group have appeared on various television shows, at award ceremonies, and political events to share their experiences losing a son or daughter to police violence and advocate for political change.

The Mothers of the Movement started as a result of the 2013 acquittal of George Zimmerman after he fatally shot and killed teenager Trayvon Martin. The women have attended many conventions to spread awareness of the crisis that is police brutality in the United States. They are using their grief to rally involvement in communities and highlight the injustice they have endured with the loss of their children's lives. They also talk about life after loss, the five stages of grief (denial, anger, bargaining, depression, and acceptance), and how to move forward after a traumatic event.

Political activism

2016 Democratic National Convention 
Seven women from the group—Gwen Carr, mother of Eric Garner; Sybrina Fulton, mother of Trayvon Martin; Maria Hamilton, mother of Dontre Hamilton; Lucy McBath, Future U.S. Representative and mother of Jordan Davis; Lezley McSpadden, mother of Michael Brown, Cleopatra Pendleton-Cowley, mother of Hadiya Pendleton; and Geneva Reed-Veal, mother of Sandra Bland—spoke in support of Clinton's candidacy for president during the July 2016 Democratic National Convention in Philadelphia. Clinton had reached out privately the previous November to meet with the women. The Mothers of the Movement subsequently joined Clinton on the campaign trail to support her candidacy and advocate for an end to these killings.

Samaria Rice, the mother of Tamir Rice, did not join the other mothers in their endorsement of Hillary Clinton. She did not see an acceptable level of commitment against police brutality from any of the candidates and therefore withheld her endorsement. She did support the other mothers, saying in an interview with Fusion, "I hope they going to hold her accountable for whatever discussions they had behind closed doors."

The Mothers of the Movement have been criticized for being used by the Clinton campaign, but members deny this claim.

Women's March 2017 

Mothers of the Movement accompanied singer and actress Janelle Monáe appearing at the Women's March on Washington on January 21, 2017, after the inauguration of President Donald Trump.

In the media 
In August 2016, several members appeared with Beyoncé at the Video Music Awards. Gwen Carr, Lezley McSpadden, and Sybrina Fulton had also appeared in the singer's short film "LEMONADE", accompanying her 2016 album of the same name, holding photos of their slain sons.

Women from the Mothers of the Movement group appeared on The Dr. Oz Show special episode entitled, "Healing America’s Grief: Mothers of The Movement And Mothers of Slain Officers Together For The First Time", which appeared on air September 12, 2016. The show featured the mothers of victims of police violence as well as mothers of police officers killed by civilians. Guests of the show included Sybrina Fulton, Lucy McBath, Geneva Reed-Veal, Cleopatra Cowley, Maria Hamilton, Samara Rice, Lesley McSpadden, Wanda Johnson, Gwen Carr, Valerie Zamarripa, Paulette Thompson, and Nancy Renninger. Both groups spoke about losing a son or daughter to violence and as well as the difficulties of grieving in public. Additionally, Reed-Veal explained the need for more global conversations about racism and violence.

Gwen Carr, Sybrina Fulton, and Lezley McSpadden spoke at the 2016 Triumph Awards, a joint venture by National Action Network and TV One to recognize distinguished individuals and corporations in civil rights, the arts, entertainment, education, business and sports who have made a positive impact on society by utilizing their talents and resources to help under-resourced communities. The ceremony was hosted at the Tabernacle Theater in Atlanta and aired on Sunday, October 2, 2016, at 7 p.m. EDT.

See also 
Black Lives Matter
Racism in the United States
Rest in Power: The Enduring Life of Trayvon Martin
2016 United States presidential election

References

2010s in the United States
African Americans' rights organizations
African-American women's organizations
Anti-black racism in the United States
Black Lives Matter
Criminal justice reform in the United States
History of African-American civil rights
Social justice organizations
Women's political advocacy groups in the United States
Anti-racist organizations
Women's organizations based in the United States